Weightlifting competitions at the 2017 Asian Indoor and Martial Arts Games in Ashgabat took place from 18 to 25 September at the Weightlifting Arena. Around 188 athletes competed in 16 different events according to their respective weight categories.

Medalists

Men

Women

Medal table

Results

Men

56 kg
18 September

62 kg
19 September

69 kg
20 September

77 kg
21 September

85 kg
22 September

94 kg
23 September

105 kg
24 September

+105 kg
25 September

Women

48 kg
18 September

53 kg
19 September

58 kg
20 September

63 kg
21 September

69 kg
22 September

75 kg
23 September

90 kg
24 September

+90 kg
25 September

References

External links
Results 
Results book – Weightlifting

Asian Indoor and Martial Arts Games
2017 Asian Indoor and Martial Arts Games events
2017